Surrattsville High School or SHS is a public high school located in Clinton, Maryland, United States and is a part of the Prince George's County Public School System in Prince George's County, Maryland.

Surrattsville was the town of Clinton's original name, taken from Mary Surratt and her family, who once owned the property on which the school now stands.

History

In 2009 Sheryll Cashin said in The Failures of Integration: How Race and Class are Undermining the American Dream that Surrattsville High was one of several mostly black, mostly middle class PG County public high schools that was "decidedly underachieving: fewer than half of the seniors at these schools went on to attend four-year colleges in recent years."

Athletics 
The boys' basketball team had a good season in 2010.

The baseball team reached the State Semifinals in 2010 before falling to Clear Spring.

Davin Meggett, son of former NFL player Dave Meggett, was part of a playoff appearance by the football team in 2007. The younger Meggett also played for the school baseball team. After leading the football team in the 2007 season, Tom Green left to be the football coach and athletic director Eleanor Roosevelt High School.

Surrattsville won the Maryland State Championship in 1962 and 1965, when it competed in the AA class, the largest at that time.  The 1965 team defeated Allegheny HS, ranked number 3 in the nation and Parkville HS, ranked number 16 in back to back games to win the title. Each team had lost only once before losing to the Hornets.  Robert Vaughn was the head coach of each state title team.

Notable alumni 
 Dan Foster, radio DJ and judge, Nigeria's Got Talent
 Dennis Felton, Cleveland State basketball coach
 Marcia Gay Harden, Academy Award-winning actress (2001 Best Supporting Actress, Pollock)
 Davin Meggett, NFL running back (Houston Texans, Washington Redskins)
 Thomas V. Mike Miller, Jr., President of the Maryland Senate
 Laura Wright, soap opera actress in Guiding Light and General Hospital
 Claire O'Dell, Lambda Literary Award-winning author

References

External links

 

Public high schools in Maryland
Schools in Prince George's County, Maryland